Costante Bonazza (6 March 1924 – 28 February 1980) was a Polish-Italian professional footballer playing as a right or central defender or attacking midfielder. He is best known for being the first Italian professional football player to play in Poland.

Born in Ceriano Laghetto, Italy on 6 March 1924, he started playing in the youth squads of Ambrosiana, and later in the Italian minor leagues. He was severely impacted by World War II, as in July 1944 he was interned at the Auschwitz concentration camp and lost all the members of his family during the war. He was released in 1945, and decided to move to Poland. He later married a Polish woman named Eleonora, and acquired Polish citizenship. He worked also in 1949 as car fitter in garage of the Provincial Headquarters of the Milicja Obywatelska in Szczecin.

He played in Poland for ten years; he made his debut in the top flight with Arkonia Szczecin for whom he played 8 games. He ended his career in 1955, and lived in Lubań Śląski till his death on 28 February 1980.

References

1924 births
1980 deaths
Polish footballers
Italian footballers
Association football defenders
Association football midfielders
Expatriate footballers in Poland
Arkonia Szczecin players
Auschwitz concentration camp survivors
People interned during World War II